Batifa is a town and sub-district in Dohuk Governorate in Kurdistan Region, Iraq. It is located in the Zakho District.

Geography

Climate
Batufa has a hot-summer Mediterranean climate (Csa) with hot dry summers and cool, wet winters. Subfreezing lows are common in the winter, providing some frost. Snowfall may occur occasionally.

Gallery

See also 
Zembîlfiroş
Grave of Zambil Froosh

References

Subdistricts of Iraq
Zakho
Kurdish settlements in Iraq
Populated places in Dohuk Province